Samvel Vladimirovich Gasparov (7 June 1938 – 26 May 2020) was a Russian film director and short story writer. He worked for some time at the Odessa Film Studio. He was buried at Khovanskoye Cemetery.

Career

Gasporov was one of the Russian filmmakers most interested in the Red Western form, having directed both Hatred and The Sixth One as well as the lesser known Bread, Gold and Pistol and Forget the Word "Death" in this genre.

Personal life
At the time of his death, Gasparov was married to actress Natalya Vavilova and had a daughter from a previous marriage.

Death
Gasparov died on 26 May 2020, at the age of 81, after contracting COVID-19 during the COVID-19 pandemic in Russia.

Filmography
1975 – Hatred
1979 – Forget the Word "Death" (Zabud'te slovo "smert")
1980 – Bread, Gold and the Nagant revolver (Khleb, zoloto, nagan)
1981 – The Sixth
1983 – Bez osobogo riska
1985 – Coordinates of Death (Koordinaty smerti)
1987 – Kak doma, kak dela?
1990 – Stervyatniki na dorogakh

References

External links

Georgian people of Armenian descent
Russian people of Armenian descent
Soviet film directors
Soviet screenwriters
Male screenwriters
1938 births
2020 deaths
Film people from Tbilisi
Deaths from the COVID-19 pandemic in Russia